Agilulf ( 555 – April 616), called the Thuringian and nicknamed Ago, was a duke of Turin and king of the Lombards from 591 until his death.

A relative of his predecessor Authari, Agilulf was of Thuringian origin and belonged to the Anawas clan. He is sometimes cited as dux Turingorum de Taurinis, that is, as a real "national" leader of a group of Thuringians who had joined the Lombards when their kingdom fell to the Franks in 531. He was selected king on the advice of the Christian queen and widow of Authari, Theodelinda, whom he then married. Although he assumed the royal dignity at the beginning of November 590, he was raised on the shield—the ceremonial investment of his title—by Lombard warriors in Milan in May 591.

He was baptized to appease his wife and his nation followed suit, though they adopted the Arian, not the Roman, faith. In 603, under the influence of his wife, he abandoned Arianism for Catholicism, and had his son Adaloald baptised. He and his wife built and endowed the cathedral of Monza, where the Iron Crown of Lombardy is still preserved and where Agilulf's crown, dedicated to St John, existed (now lost) bearing the inscription rex totius Italiae, meaning "king of all Italy", as Agilulf evidently saw himself.

His long reign was marked by the cessation of war with Francia, whose chief peacemaker Guntram, king of Burgundy, had died in 592. Without him, the Franks descended into civil war which prevented a united assault on Lombardy throughout Agilulf's rule. A truce with the Papacy negotiated in 598 temporarily ended thirty years of Lombard terror in the Ducatus Romanus and he spent most of his war-making energies on the Byzantine threat. In that year, he consolidated Lombard power, extending the dominion of his kingdom by taking Sutri and Perugia among other Umbrian cities from the exarchate of Ravenna, while maintaining good relations with the Bavarians. He fought the Avars and Slavs, and entered a truce with the Byzantine emperor Maurice in 598 with the aid of Pope Gregory the Great. The following year, Exarch Callinicus broke the truce by kidnapping the travelling daughter of the Lombard king. War erupted and, in 602, the Byzantine emperor Phocas lost Padua, which Authari had cut off from Ravenna a decade prior. The loss of Padua in turn cut off Mantua and, before the year was out, that city too fell to Agilulf.

In 607, Witteric, king of the Visigoths, initiated a quadruple alliance against Theuderic II of Burgundy involving Theudebert II of Austrasia, Clotaire II of Neustria, and Agilulf. Theuderic's grandmother and sister had murdered Theuderic's wife, the daughter of Witteric. The alliance does not seem to have had success. Nothing of any actual combat is known except that it took place, probably around Narbonne.

In 605, he was recognized by the emperor Phocas, who paid a tribute and ceded Orvieto among other towns. The Persian Wars drew Byzantine attention to the Orient and gave respite to Agilulf's final decade on the throne. He had to put down some insurrections and the Avars did not desist from invading Friuli, where they slew its duke, Gisulf, in 610. Otherwise, his reign ended peacefully and he died in 616, after reigning for more than a quarter of a century. He was succeeded by Adaloald, his son by Theodelinda, who was still an adolescent, though he had been associated with the throne. He had a daughter Gundeberga who married Arioald who later became king.

Notes 

550s births
Year of birth uncertain
616 deaths
6th-century Lombard monarchs
7th-century Lombard monarchs
6th-century Arian Christians
7th-century Arian Christians
Lombard warriors
People from Monza
People from Brianza
Baiuvarii